Roper is an unincorporated community in Wilson County, Kansas, United States.

History
Roper was founded in 1886. It was named Roper in honor of a railroad official.

The post office in Roper was discontinued in 1933.

References

Further reading

External links
 Wilson County maps: Current, Historic, KDOT

Unincorporated communities in Wilson County, Kansas
Unincorporated communities in Kansas